The stomochord is a flexible, hollow tube found in hemichordates.  Stomochords arise in embryonic development as an outpocketing from the roof of the embryonic gut anterior to the pharynx. In adults, they extend dorsally from the pharynx into the proboscis, and it communicates with the oral cavity. Their walls are composed primarily of epithelial cells, including ciliated and glandular cells.

Relationship to chordate anatomy 

Stomochords were initially considered a variant of a primitive notochord, a defining feature of chordates. However, they are now recognized to not share histological composition to that of the notochord found in chordates, lacking the fibrous sheath characteristic of a notochord.

In addition, gene expression studies have failed to provide any evidence for homology between the notochord and the stomochord, or between the notochord and any hemichordate structure. The Brachyury (T) gene, which is expressed in the ascidian and other chordates notochord, is not expressed in the stomochord, and collagen is absent.

References

Endoderm
Histology